Solmous 'Solomon' Wakeley (March 17, 1794 – January 12, 1867) was a pioneer Wisconsin legislator.  He served two terms in the Wisconsin State Assembly and was a delegate to the first Wisconsin constitutional convention for Walworth County.

Biography

Born in New Milford, Connecticut, Wakeley settled in Homer, New York, then Pennsylvania, Ohio, and finally Whitewater, Wisconsin. He served in the first Wisconsin Constitutional Convention of 1846. He served in the Wisconsin State Assembly in 1855, 1857. One of his sons was Judge Eleazer Wakeley, who also served in the Wisconsin Legislature before becoming a judge in Nebraska.

Notes

People from New Milford, Connecticut
People from Homer, New York
People from Whitewater, Wisconsin
Members of the Wisconsin State Assembly
1794 births
1867 deaths
19th-century American politicians